The Anamosa Community School District (ACSD) is a rural public school district headquartered in Anamosa, Iowa.

It encompasses part of Jones County and a small portion of eastern Linn County. The cities of Anamosa, Martelle and Morley are in the school district, along with the unincorporated communities of Amber, Fairview and Viola. The Anamosa school district currently has three schools. Strawberry Hill Elementary, Anamosa Middle School and Anamosa High School. Their sports teams are called Blue Raiders.

List of schools
Strawberry Hill Elementary, Anamosa
Anamosa Middle School, Anamosa
Anamosa High School, Anamosa

History
When the district was organized into its current form, ACSD had schools in two elementary schools in Anamosa and one each in Martelle, Morley and Viola, along with the middle school and high school in Anamosa. Morley closed in the 1960s followed by West Elementary in Anamosa (For many years called Anamosa Elementary) in 1982. Martelle closed in 1990 and reorganization took place with K-2 attending Strawberry Hill in Anamosa 3–4 at Viola, and 5–8 at the Middle School. Viola closed in 1998 moving K-4 back to Strawberry Hill along with 5th graders who moved over from the Middle School.

The District's Future
With West Middle School nearing 100 years old, a new middle school was built in 2012 on Old Dubuque road in Anamosa thus closing the West Middle School and beginning the start of Anamosa Middle School. The Ellen Kennedy Performing Arts Center opened spring of 2016.

Anamosa High School

Athletics
Since 2017, the Raiders compete in the River Valley Conference, after leaving the WaMaC Conference.  The Raiders compete in the following sports:

Baseball
Bowling
Basketball (boys and girls)
Cross Country (boys and girls)
Football
Golf (boys and girls)
 Boys' - 1999 Class 2A State Champions
Soccer (boys and girls)
Softball
Swimming (boys and girls)
Tennis (boys and girls)
Track and Field (boys and girls)
 Boys' - 3-time State Champions (1956, 1974, 1975)
Volleyball
Wrestling

See also
List of school districts in Iowa
List of high schools in Iowa

References

External links
 Anamosa School District

Anamosa, Iowa
School districts in Iowa
Education in Jones County, Iowa
Education in Linn County, Iowa